Peaceful Journey is the third album by American rap group Heavy D & the Boyz. It was released on July 2, 1991, for Uptown Records and was produced by Pete Rock, DJ Eddie F, Teddy Riley, Marley Marl and Howie Tee.  This marked the group's first album since the death of member Trouble T Roy, who died almost a year before the album's release, and several on the album pay tribute to him. Though not as successful as the group's previous album, Big Tyme, the album was able to reach Platinum status and made it to number 21 on the Billboard 200 and number 5 on the Top R&B/Hip-Hop Albums chart. 

The following singles also charted: "Now That We Found Love" (UK #2, US #11), "Is It Good to You (Heavy D)" which sampled the beginning from Mama Used to Say by Junior, "Don't Curse" and "Peaceful Journey", which sampled the bass line from This Place Hotel by The Jacksons. Guests on the album include Aaron Hall, Big Daddy Kane, Grand Puba, Kool G. Rap, Q-Tip, Pete Rock & CL Smooth, Daddy Freddy and K-Ci & JoJo.  One of the songs, "Is It Good to You (Heavy D)", has since been remade by Teddy Riley and featured singer Tammy Lucas for the soundtrack to the movie Juice.

Critical reception
James Muretich from Calgary Herald wrote, "Heavy D. lays down uplifting messages without getting wimpy, is sexual without becoming moronically macho. Combine that with hook-laden songs sampling from the likes of Booker T. & the M.G.'s and The Persuaders, as well as some riffs by The Boyz, and you`ve got rap with soul - in every sense of the word." James Bernard from Entertainment Weekly commented, "His music in Peaceful Journey, softened by hummable bass lines, swings rather than stomps, and the ”Hevster” has nimble lyrics to match — a combination that should earn songs like ”Now That We Found Love”, a fast-paced hip-house jam, loads of club and airplay. There are too few surprises here, however, in part because Heavy D. sometimes leans too much on sampled tracks, as on the title cut, an ode to friendship that is far too friendly with the Jacksons’ ”This Place Hotel”."

Track listing
"Now That We Found Love" (feat. Aaron Hall) (Kenneth Gamble, Leon Huff) - 4:18
"Let It Rain" (Dwight Meyers, Peter Phillips) - 4:15 
"I Can Make You Go Oooh" (Dwight Meyers, Howard Thompson) - 3:51 
"Sister Sister" (Dwight Meyers, Marlon Williams) - 4:39 
"Don't Curse" feat. Big Daddy Kane, Grand Puba, Kool G. Rap, Q-Tip & Pete Rock & CL Smooth (Dwight Meyers, Antonio Hardy, Maxwell Dixon, Nathaniel Wilson, Jonathan Davis, Peter Phillips, Corey Penn) - 5:53 
"Peaceful Journey" (Dwight Meyers, Edward Ferrell) - 6:05 
"The Lover's Got What U Need" (Dwight Meyers, Marlon Williams) - 4:02 
"Cuz He'z Alwayz Around" (Dwight Meyers, Peter Phillips) - 4:40 
"Is It Good to You" (Dwight Meyers, Teddy Riley) - 4:52 
"Letter to the Future" (Dwight Meyers, Peter Phillips) - 4:49 
"Swinging With Da Hevster" (Dwight Meyers, Marlon Williams) - 4:20 
"Body and Mind" feat. Daddy Freddy (Bunny Sigler, James Sigler, Cary Gilbert) - 4:20 
"Do Me, Do Me" (Dwight Meyers, Peter Phillips) - 4:11

Personnel
 Teddy Riley, Pete Rock, Marley Marl, Howie Tee, Dave Hall, Nevelle Hodge, Darren Lighty: Keyboards and Drum Programming
 Aaron Hall: Background vocals on "Now That We've Found Love"
 The Flex (Darren Lighty, Cliff Lighty, Eric Williams): Background vocals on "Sister, Sister" and "The Lover's Got What U Need"
 K-Ci & JoJo: Background vocals on "Peaceful Journey"
 Perfection: Background vocals on "The Lover's Got What U Need"
 Johnny Gill: Background vocals on "Letter to the Future"
 Dave Way, Chris "Champ" Champion, Booker T. Jones, Angela Piva, Marley Marl, David Kennedy: Recording engineer
 Chris "Champ" Champion, Mark Partis, Angela Piva, Roey Shamir, David Kennedy: Mixing
 Nick Baratta: Photography
 Reiner Design Consultants, Inc.: Art Direction

Samples

"Do Me, Do Me"
"Funky President" by James Brown
"Don't Curse"
"Hip Hug-Her" by Booker T. & the M.G.'s
"Tramp" by Otis Redding and Carla Thomas 
"Just Rhymin' With Biz" by Big Daddy Kane feat. Biz Markie
"Is It Good to You"
"Mama Used to Say" by Junior
"Letter to the Future"
"Who's Gonna Take the Weight" by Kool and the Gang
"Peace of Mind" by S.O.U.L.
"Now That We Found Love"
"Now That We Found Love" by Third World
"Peaceful Journey"
"Funky Drummer" by James Brown
"This Place Hotel (Heartbreak Hotel)" by The Jackson 5
"Swinging With Da Hevster"
"Rock Creek Park" by The Blackbyrds
"The Lover's Got What You Need"
"Love Hangover" by Diana Ross
"Hot Pants (Bonus Beats)" by Bobby Byrd

Charts

Weekly charts

Year-end charts

Certifications

References

External links
 Heavy D & the Boyz-Peaceful Journey at Discogs

1991 albums
Heavy D albums
Albums produced by Marley Marl
Albums produced by Pete Rock
Albums produced by Teddy Riley
Albums produced by Howie Tee
Uptown Records albums
MCA Records albums